Rajasimha may refer to:

 Rajasinha I of Sitawaka
 Maravarman Rajasimha I